Leland Snow was an American aeronautical engineer known for designing and developing agricultural aircraft. He was the founder and president of Air Tractor.

Snow began designing his first aerial application aircraft, the S-1, in 1951  when he was 21 years old. That airplane remained in production until 1957, after which Snow introduced the S-2A and S-2B models and built a factory in Olney, Texas, which opened in 1958. Snow sold his company, Snow Aeronautical, to Rockwell-Standard in 1965 and started working as the vice president of its Aero Commander division.

Snow founded Air Tractor in 1972 after resigning from Rockwell. The construction of AT-300 began in late 1972, which later became the AT-301. Air Tractor's first turbine model, the AT-302, was introduced in 1977.

Snow died on February 20, 2011, in Wichita Falls, Texas.

References

External links
Official website

2011 deaths
People from Olney, Texas
20th-century American inventors
American businesspeople